Cardinal of Urbino may refer to:

 Giovanni Battista Mellini (1405-1478), bishop of Urbino, 1468–78, cardinal 1476-78
 Gabriele de' Gabrielli (1445-1511), bishop of Urbino, 1504–11, cardinal 1505-11